In mathematical complex analysis, a quasiconformal mapping, introduced by  and named by , is a homeomorphism between plane domains which to first order takes small circles to small ellipses of bounded eccentricity.

Intuitively, let f : D → D′ be an orientation-preserving homeomorphism between open sets in the plane. If f is continuously differentiable, then it is K-quasiconformal if the derivative of f at every point maps circles to ellipses with eccentricity bounded by K.

Definition
Suppose f : D → D′ where D and D′ are two domains in C.  There are a variety of equivalent definitions, depending on the required smoothness of f.  If f is assumed to have continuous partial derivatives, then f is quasiconformal provided it satisfies the Beltrami equation

for some complex valued Lebesgue measurable μ satisfying sup |μ| < 1 .  This equation admits a geometrical interpretation. Equip D with the metric tensor

where Ω(z) > 0. Then f satisfies precisely when it is a conformal transformation from D equipped with this metric to the domain D′ equipped with the standard Euclidean metric. The function f is then called μ-conformal. More generally, the continuous differentiability of f can be replaced by the weaker condition that f be in the Sobolev space W1,2(D) of functions whose first-order distributional derivatives are in L2(D).

Without appeal to an auxiliary metric, consider the effect of the pullback under f of the usual Euclidean metric.  The resulting metric is then given by

which, relative to the background Euclidean metric , has eigenvalues

The eigenvalues represent, respectively, the squared length of the major and minor axis of the ellipse obtained by pulling back along f the unit circle in the tangent plane.

Accordingly, the dilatation of f at a point z is defined by

The (essential) supremum of K(z) is given by

and is called the dilatation of f.

A definition based on the notion of extremal length is as follows. If there is a finite K such that for every collection Γ of curves in D the extremal length of Γ is at most K times the extremal length of {f o γ : γ ∈ Γ}. Then f is K-quasiconformal.

If f is K-quasiconformal for some finite K, then f is quasiconformal.

A few facts about quasiconformal mappings

If K > 1 then the maps x + iy ↦ Kx + iy and x + iy ↦ x + iKy are both quasiconformal and have constant dilatation K.

If s > −1 then the map  is quasiconformal (here z is a complex number) and has constant dilatation . When s ≠ 0, this is an example of a quasiconformal homeomorphism that is not smooth.  If s = 0, this is simply the identity map.

A homeomorphism is 1-quasiconformal if and only if it is conformal. Hence the identity map is always 1-quasiconformal. If f : D → D′ is K-quasiconformal and g : D′ → D′′ is K′-quasiconformal, then g o f is KK′-quasiconformal. The inverse of a K-quasiconformal homeomorphism is K-quasiconformal. The set of 1-quasiconformal maps forms a group under composition.

The space of K-quasiconformal mappings from the complex plane to itself mapping three distinct points to three given points is compact.

Measurable Riemann mapping theorem
Of central importance in the theory of quasiconformal mappings in two dimensions is the measurable Riemann mapping theorem, proved by  Lars Ahlfors and Lipman Bers. The theorem generalizes the Riemann mapping theorem from conformal to quasiconformal homeomorphisms, and is stated as follows. Suppose that D is a simply connected domain in C that is not equal to C, and suppose that μ : D → C is Lebesgue measurable and satisfies . Then there is a quasiconformal homeomorphism f from D to the unit disk which is in the Sobolev space W1,2(D) and satisfies the corresponding Beltrami equation in the distributional sense. As with Riemann's mapping theorem, this f is unique up to 3 real parameters.

Computational quasi-conformal geometry
Recently, quasi-conformal geometry has attracted attention from different fields, such as applied mathematics, computer vision and medical imaging. Computational quasi-conformal geometry has been developed, which extends the quasi-conformal theory into a discrete setting. It has found various important applications in medical image analysis, computer vision and graphics.

See also
Isothermal coordinates
Quasiregular map
Pseudoanalytic function
Teichmüller space
Tissot's indicatrix

References

.
, (reviews of the first edition:).
.
.
.
 .

 (also available as ).
.
   Papadopoulos, Athanase, ed. (2007), Handbook of Teichmüller theory. Vol. I, IRMA Lectures in Mathematics and Theoretical Physics, 11, European Mathematical Society (EMS), Zürich, .
   Papadopoulos, Athanase, ed. (2009), Handbook of Teichmüller theory. Vol. II, IRMA Lectures in Mathematics and Theoretical Physics, 13, European Mathematical Society (EMS), Zürich, .
.

Conformal mappings
Homeomorphisms
Complex analysis